Nocardioides alkalitolerans is a gram-positive bacterium from the genus Nocardioides that has been isolated from soil in South Korea.

References

Further reading

External links
Type strain of Nocardioides alkalitolerans at BacDive -  the Bacterial Diversity Metadatabase

alkalitolerans
Bacteria described in 2005